National Tertiary Route 616, or just Route 616 (or ) is a National Road Route of Costa Rica, located in the Puntarenas province.

Description
In Puntarenas province the route covers Quepos canton (Quepos, Naranjito districts).

References

Highways in Costa Rica